Coquitlam was a provincial electoral district in the Canadian province of British Columbia from 1966 to 1975.  The riding's successor was the Coquitlam-Moody riding.

For other Greater Vancouver area ridings please see New Westminster (electoral districts) and/or Vancouver (electoral districts).

Demographics

Political geography

Notable elections

Notable MLAs

Electoral history 

|- bgcolor="white"
!align="right" colspan=3|Total valid votes
!align="right"|17,240 
!align="right"|100.00%
!align="right"|
|- bgcolor="white"
!align="right" colspan=3|Total rejected ballots
!align="right"|155
!align="right"|
!align="right"|
|- bgcolor="white"
!align="right" colspan=3|Turnout
!align="right"|%
!align="right"|
!align="right"|
|}

 
|New Democrat
|Dave Barrett
|align="right"|12,948 		 	
|align="right"|47.67%
|align="right"|
|align="right"|unknown

|- bgcolor="white"
!align="right" colspan=3|Total valid votes
!align="right"|27,161
!align="right"|100.00%
!align="right"|
|- bgcolor="white"
!align="right" colspan=3|Total rejected ballots
!align="right"|213
!align="right"|
!align="right"|
|- bgcolor="white"
!align="right" colspan=3|Turnout
!align="right"|%
!align="right"|
!align="right"|
|}

 
|Progressive Conservative
|Faith Helen Elly Trent
|align="right"|2,035 		
|align="right"|6.02%
|align="right"|
|align="right"|unknown
|- bgcolor="white"
!align="right" colspan=3|Total valid votes
!align="right"|33,822 	
!align="right"|100.00%
!align="right"|
|- bgcolor="white"
!align="right" colspan=3|Total rejected ballots
!align="right"|234
!align="right"|
!align="right"|
|- bgcolor="white"
!align="right" colspan=3|Turnout
!align="right"|%
!align="right"|
!align="right"|
|}

|Independent
|Bernd Fritz Stoelzle
|align="right"|99 	 	 	 	 	
|align="right"|0.25%
|align="right"|
|align="right"|unknown

|Independent
|Larry William Johnson
|align="right"|73 	 	 	 	 	
|align="right"|0.19%
|align="right"|
|align="right"|unknown

 
|North American Labour Party
|Alan Levinson
|align="right"|17 	
|align="right"|0.04%
|align="right"|
|align="right"|unknown
|- bgcolor="white"
!align="right" colspan=3|Total valid votes
!align="right"|39,246 	 		
!align="right"|100.00%
!align="right"|
|- bgcolor="white"
!align="right" colspan=3|Total rejected ballots
!align="right"|319
!align="right"|
!align="right"|
|- bgcolor="white"
!align="right" colspan=3|Turnout
!align="right"|%
!align="right"|
!align="right"|
|}

External links

Sources 

Elections BC Historical Returns

Former provincial electoral districts of British Columbia
Politics of Coquitlam